Haku, Nepal may refer to:

 Haku, Bagmati
 Haku, Karnali